The Egypt Exploration Society (EES) is a British non-profit organization. The society was founded in 1882 by Amelia Edwards and Reginald Stuart Poole in order to examine and excavate in the areas of Egypt and Sudan. The intent was to study and analyze the results of the excavations and publish the information for the scholarly world. 

The EES have worked at many major Egyptian excavation and sites. Their discoveries include the discovery of a shrine for the goddess Hathor, a statue of a cow from Deir el-Bahri, the mortuary temple of Queen Hatshepsut, and the sculpted model of Nefertiti from Amarna. The Society has made major contributions to the study of the ancient Egyptian world. The Society is based in London and is a registered charity under English law.

History

In 1873, the English writer Amelia Edwards was led to the sites of Egypt while encountering cold, wet climates in Europe. She and several friends ended up travelling up the River Nile from Cairo to Abu Simbel. She recorded the events and discoveries of this journey and eventually published it as A Thousand Miles up the Nile in 1876. The book became renowned for its description of 19th-century Egypt and the largely un-excavated antiques that she encountered. Edwards' descriptions changed the world's perspective on both modern and ancient Egypt. This attracted the attention of both scholarly society and the rest of the world. It ended up becoming a bestseller due to this increased interest, which prompted Edwards to think about continuing her studies of Ancient Egypt. 

In 1882, Amelia Edwards and Reginald Stuart Poole, an employee from the Department of Coins and Medals at the British Museum, decided to create the Egypt Exploration Fund as a way to raise funds for more excavations in the Delta, which had been noted as being rarely visited. After announcing their intentions in  The Times, they started off being funded by individuals such as the Archbishop of Canterbury. the poet Robert Browning and Sir Erasmus Wilson. Wilson, in particular, showed enough interest to pledge £500 to the Egypt Exploration Fund. This marked the start of the Egypt Exploration Society.

Beginning
The first excavator of the Egypt Exploration Fund was Édouard Naville, a Swiss Egyptologist and Biblical scholar. In January 1883, Naville set out for Tell el-Maskhuta. His goal was to find the route of the Biblical exodus as the Fund had decided to broaden its interests in order to appeal to a wider audience. Naville's work attracted much interest from the public and at the first General Meeting of the Fund, which happened on 3 July 1883, the society was seen to have a good amount of funds in its accounts. A copy of Naville's work was distributed to the subscribers of the Fund. Eventually the Fund decided to have the subscribers become members instead.

Second excavation
During the second excavation, the Fund sent Flinders Petrie, an English Egyptologist, who went to Tanis, a site linked to the Biblical city of Zoan. Petrie focussed much of his work on the ordinary dwellings of the site. This presented a new array of discoveries for the society. Petrie was among the first to understand that there was more than æsthetically appealing objects. Rather, he understood that many objects could provide information about the society of that time. He developed many techniques in which he could excavate and record the objects he found and his overall findings. At the end of his excavation, Petrie was able to bring back many valuable findings and items that he donated to the British Museum. The society became one of the first to provide scientifically excavated objects around Britain as well as overseas.

Third excavation
By the time of the third excavation, and the third year since the Fund was established, the society was able to send Edouard Naville, Flinders Petrie and Francis Llewellyn Griffith to Egypt. During this time and for the next few years, the Fund was able to bring back many findings, which resulted in the advancement of knowledge on Ancient Egypt. Some of the sites included the fortified camp and Tell Dafana and the temple of Bastet.

Name change
In 1919, at the end of the First World War, the Egypt Excavation Fund changed its name to the Egypt Exploration Society.

Publishing works and base
Today, the EES continues to publish its annual organ, the Journal of Egyptian Archaeology, which details the society's findings, for all of its members to read. They also publish a newsletter bi-annually called Egyptian Archaeology. The Egypt Exploration Society has been based in Doughty Mews, London WC1N since 1969.

2019 theft case
In October 2019 officials from the Egypt Exploration Society alleged that Oxford professor, Dirk Obbink, engaged in the theft and sale of "at least 11 ancient Bible fragments to the Green family, the Hobby Lobby owners who operate a Bible museum and charitable organization in Washington." The Museum of the Bible said it will return the fragments to the Egypt Exploration Society and Oxford University.

Notable members

 Dorothy Charlesworth; field director of excavations at Buto (Tell el-Farâ'în) in 1969
 Mary Chubb; the first professional excavation administrator
 H. W. Fairman; Egyptologist and director of field operations.
 Veronica Seton-Williams; field director of excavations at Buto (Tell el-Farâ'în) 1964–1968
 Harry Smith; director of Egyptian Nubian Survey

See also
 Barbara Mertz
 Dirk Obbink and the controversy over "First Century Mark" and other items from the Egypt Exploration Society collection
 Edouard Naville
 Egyptology
 Flinders Petrie
 Francis Llewellyn Griffith
 Palestine Exploration Fund

References

External links
 Egypt Exploration Society – the home page of the society
 Artefacts of Excavation - showing excavations and where finds were sent

Archaeological organizations
Charities based in England
Egyptology
Organisations based in the London Borough of Camden
Organizations established in 1882